Hồng Giang may refer to several places in Vietnam, including:

Hồng Giang, Bắc Giang, a rural commune of Lục Ngạn District
, a rural commune of Đông Hưng District